David Eduardo Nolting (born 21 June 1904 - 3 March 1990) was an Argentine rower. He competed in the men's eight event at the 1924 Summer Olympics.

References

External links
 

1904 births
1990 deaths
Argentine male rowers
Olympic rowers of Argentina
Rowers at the 1924 Summer Olympics
Rowers from Buenos Aires